Telefónica SA v Commission (2014) C-295/12 is a European competition law case relevant for UK enterprise law, concerning telecommunications.

Facts
Telefonica appealed against a Commission fine of €151m for abuse of dominance for wholesale ADSL broadband in Spain from 2001-2006. Telefonica had a statutory monopoly on retail provision of landlines before 1998. It was the only company with a nationwide fixed telephone network. It provided wholesale broadband to other telecomms companies, and its own retail services. The Commission found Telefonica imposed unfair prices through a margin squeeze on competitors, so the difference between their wholesale prices and its retail prices were not enough to make a profit. It assessed Telefonica’s downstream costs using LRAIC as the standard.

The General Court held that to establish a margin squeeze there was no need to show excessive or predatory prices: the abuse was in the spread available. The test was whether an equally efficient competitor, based on the dominant undertaking’s own costs could survive.

Judgment
The CJEU upheld the General Court's decision in its entirety, so that Telefonica still had to pay a fine for abuse of a dominant position.

See also

United Kingdom enterprise law
EU law

Notes

References

United Kingdom enterprise case law